Kouriogenys is a genus of extinct mammal from the Early Cretaceous of southern England. The type and only species was originally described as Spalacotherium minus by Richard Owen in 1871 for a dentary with teeth from the Berriasian Lulworth Formation, although it was given its own genus in 2012 by Brian Davis. The genus name is taken from the Ancient Greek "youthful" and "jaw" in reference to the replacement method of the premolars. Kouriogenys is closely related to coexisting genera Peramus and Peramuroides, and along with other genera these make up the family Peramuridae, a group of extinct zatherians.

References

Early Cretaceous mammals of Europe
Berriasian genera
Prehistoric mammal genera
Fossil taxa described in 2012